The ATP International Series (known from 1990 to 1997 as the ATP World Series) was a series of professional tennis tournaments held internationally as part of the ATP Tour from 2000 to 2008.

The series was renamed ATP Tour 250 in 2009.  International Series offered players cash prizes (tournaments have purses from $416,000 to $1,000,000) and the ability to earn ATP ranking points. They generally offered less prize money and fewer points than the ATP International Series Gold, but more than tournaments on the ATP Challenger Series.

Tournaments 
The locations and titles of these tournaments were subject to change every year. The tournaments – in calendar order – in 2008 were:

Singles champions

ATP International Series

Doubles champions

ATP International Series

See also 
 ATP International Series Gold
 List of tennis tournaments

External links